Melaspileaceae is a family of lichenized, lichenicolous and saprobic fungi within Ascomycota. These fungi have long been poorly understood, and the family's taxonomic position has been unclear because of insufficient molecular data. It was previously included in the order Arthoniales (class Arthoniomycetes) but recent phylogenetic analyses indicate that it instead belongs to the order Eremithallales (class Dothideomycetes).

Eremithallales was circumscribed as a new order in 2008, and Eremithallus costaricensis was included as the only species. The phylogenetic results placing Melaspileaceae in Eremithallales are corresponding with the morphology as the only genus in Eremithallales are sharing morphological similarities with Melaspilea, which is the type genus of Melaspileaceae. They are both being lichenized with a trentepohlioid photobiont and they share similarities in ascomata, exciple, hamathecium, ascus and ascospore types. This means Eremithallaceae has now been synonymized under Melaspileaceae, and Eremithallus costaricensis is included in the genus Melaspilea.

References

Dothideomycetes
Dothideomycetes families
Lichen families
Taxa described in 1929
Taxa named by William Watson (botanist)